Chudinovo is a rural locality (a village) in Nikolskoye Rural Settlement, Kaduysky District, Vologda Oblast, Russia. The population was 11 as of 2002.

Geography 
Chudinovo is located 41 km northeast of Kaduy (the district's administrative centre) by road. Semenskaya is the nearest rural locality.

References 

Rural localities in Kaduysky District